The Bihu Park is a park in Neihu District, Taipei, Taiwan.

History
The park was opened in 1987.

Geography
The park covers an area of 13.1 hectares. A 7 hectares of lake located within the park area is the Dapi Lake, which was once used for farming irrigation. The lake has a large population of invasive Amazon sailfin catfish.

Features
The park features the lakeside walkways which was completed and opened to public in 2007 with a total distance of 1.4 km. There is also a nine-turn bridge. It houses various flora as well, such as willows, bald cypresses, cajeput trees, golden showers, royal poincianas, Chinese hibiscus, azaleas and Ixora westii. The park management center houses a 45-seating capacity reading room, tennis courts, swimming pool and other recreational facilities. Visitors can also fish and hike in its six mountain trails to choose from with rest pavilions along the way.

Transportation
The park is accessible within walking distance north from Wende Station of Taipei Metro.

See also
 List of parks in Taiwan

References

External link

1987 establishments in Taiwan
Parks established in 1987
Parks in Taipei
Lakes of Taiwan